Jefferies is a surname.

Jeffries may also refer to:

 Jefferies Group, global investment bank and institutional securities firm
 Jefferies tube, fictional machinery-access mechanism in Star Trek live-action follow-ons

See also
 Jeffries, a surname
 Jeffreys (disambiguation)
 Jeffery (disambiguation)
 Jeffrey (disambiguation)